Mycobacterium pinnipedii is a member of the Mycobacterium tuberculosis complex which primarily infects seals.  It is a slowly growing Mycobacterium.  The species is named after the Pinnipeds, the organisms from which M. pinnipedii was first isolated.

In 2014, a genetic study showed that Peruvian human skeleton dating to 1000 CE had been infected with a form of tuberculosis most closely related to M. pinnipedii, suggesting that seals had served as a vector for transmission of tuberculosis from the Old World to the New.

References

External links

Acid-fast bacilli
pinnipedii
Bacteria described in 2003